Duno may refer to:

People
 José Duno (born 1977), Venezuelan football player
 Milka Duno (born 1972), Venezuelan race car driver
 Romero Duno (born 1995), Filipino boxer

Places
 Duno, Lombardy, a village in the province of Varese, northern Italy
 Dunö, Kalmar County, Sweden

Organizations 
 Duno College, former name of Dorenweerd College
 DUNO, Dutch football club

See also
 Duno-, prefix meaning fort in many toponyms, derived from dun